El Wiam (lit. Party of the Democratic and Social Agreement, PEDS) was a centrist political party in Mauritania led by Boïdiel Ould Houmeit. It was made up mainly of officials from the government of President Maaouya Ould Taya.

History
El Wiam was one of the many opposition groups which took part in the 2011 Mauritanian protests, protesting against the authoritarian rule of Mohamed Ould Abdel Aziz. The party won ten seats in the 2013 parliamentary elections, emerging as the third largest party in the National Assembly. It nominated Boïdiel Ould Houmeit as its candidate for the 2014 presidential elections. Ould Houmeit finished third out of five candidates with 4.5% of the vote.

The party merged into the governing Union for the Republic on 28 October 2018 after losing several seats on the September 2018 parliamentary elections.

References

Defunct political parties in Mauritania
Political parties disestablished in 2018
2018 disestablishments in Mauritania